Turbonilla haycocki is a species of sea snail, a marine gastropod mollusk in the family Pyramidellidae, the pyrams and their allies.

Description
The shell grows to a length of 7 mm.

Distribution
This marine species occurs off Bermuda (at a depth of 75 m), Puerto Rico, and Northeast Brazil

References

External links
 To Biodiversity Heritage Library (1 publication)
 To Encyclopedia of Life
 To USNM Invertebrate Zoology Mollusca Collection
 To ITIS
 To World Register of Marine Species

haycocki
Gastropods described in 1911